Serhat Balcı (born March 15, 1982, in Üsküdar, Istanbul) is a male sport wrestler from Turkey competing in the 96 kg division of freestyle wrestling.

Serhat Balcı holds a silver medal won at the 2011 World Wrestling Championships in Istanbul, Turkey and another silver medal won at the 2005 European Wrestling Championships in Varna, Bulgaria. He represented Turkey at the 2008 Summer Olympics without winning a medal.

He qualified for the participation at the 2012 Summer Olympics representing Turkey where he lost to Magomed Musaev of Dagestan.

References

External links
 

Living people
1982 births
Turkish male sport wrestlers
Olympic wrestlers of Turkey
Wrestlers at the 2008 Summer Olympics
People from Üsküdar
Wrestlers at the 2012 Summer Olympics
Sportspeople from Istanbul
World Wrestling Championships medalists
Mediterranean Games gold medalists for Turkey
Competitors at the 2005 Mediterranean Games
Mediterranean Games medalists in wrestling
21st-century Turkish people